HMS La Hogue was a 74-gun third-rate ship of the line of the Royal Navy, launched on 3 October 1811 at Deptford. She was named after the 1692 Battle of La Hogue. "The La Hogue of 1811 [...] sported a green and chocolate lion, its grinning mouth displaying rows of white teeth and a huge red tongue."

During the War of 1812, while under the command of Thomas Bladen Capel, on 16 May 1813 Hogue recaptured and sent to Halifax, Nova Scotia the packet . Ann had been on her way from Jamaica to Halifax when the American privateer Yorktown had captured her. However, the American privateer Young Teazer again captured Ann and sent her into Portland, Maine.

Later, La Hogue successfully trapped Young Teazer off the coast of Nova Scotia, British North America.

On 16 August 1813 La Hogue captured the Portuguese ship Flor de Mar. At the time  was in sight.

La Hogue was driven ashore at Halifax, Nova Scotia, on 12 November 1813 during a storm. She was refloated, repaired, and returned to service.

From 7–8 April 1814, ships' boats of the La Hogue, Maidstone and  attacked Pettipague point. In 1847 the Admiralty awarded the Naval General Service Medal with clasp "8 Apr Boat Service 1814" to all surviving claimants from the action. The raid was commanded by Coote, who was promoted as a result of the successful outcome, as was Lieutenant Pyne of the La Hogue who assisted him.

In September, 1814 La Hogue landed near the Old Scituate Light station with the intent of sending a raiding party into the town.  Rebecca and Abigail Bates, the lighthouse keeper's daughters, repulsed the attack by playing a drum and a fife that had been left at the station.

She was converted into a screw-propelled steamship frigate in 1850. From 1852 she acted as a guard-ship at Devonport under the command of Captain William Ramsay and saw her final service, still under Ramsay, on duties in the Baltic Sea during the Crimean War. On 18 September 1855, she ran aground off Renskär, Sweden and was severely damaged. She was refloated with the assistance of three gunboats after her lower deck guns were taken out.

She was eventually broken up in 1865.

Notes, citations, and references
Notes

Citations

References

 
Lavery, Brian (2003) The Ship of the Line - Volume 1: The development of the battlefleet 1650-1850. Conway Maritime Press. .

External links
 
 HMS La Hogue history

Ships of the line of the Royal Navy
Vengeur-class ships of the line
Ships built in Deptford
1811 ships
War of 1812 ships of the United Kingdom
Crimean War naval ships of the United Kingdom
Maritime incidents in 1813
Maritime incidents in September 1855